Ukanafun is located in the South South of Nigeria and is a Local Government Area of Akwa Ibom State.

Ukanafun was carved out from Abak and Opobo divisions of Cross River State. The Nigerian Civil war depopulated the area and slowed economic activities of the people.

The Ukanafun area is yet to recover from the shock of the civil war not to talk of ethnic politics that have made one of the great commercial nerve centres of the people of Annang extraction almost completely reduced to the background due to the absence of a good road network that once characterised the area in the time of the colonial masters. Palm produce used to be the major economic activity of the people. Ntak Ibesit now under Oruk Anam LGA used to be the centre of the palm kernel trade at its Ekpene Okpo river port which served as an excellent trade route to Opobo. Today there is no port in Ntak Ibesit.
Today, Ukanafun is made up of a host of villages some of which are: Ikot Ibekwe, Akoyo, Ikot Una, Idung Nnekke, Nkek, Nkek Idim, Afaha Obo, Ikot Esien, Nyak Ibah, Ikot Andem, Ikot Etim, Ikot Oku Usung, Ikot Uko, Ikot Akpa Ntuen, Ikot Inyang Abia, Ntak Afagha, Nto Okon, Usung Atiat, Ikot Udo Osiom, Ikot Akpa Idem, etc.

Economy 
Fishing is a significant financial movement occupied with by individuals of Ukanfun LGA with the area's waterways and streams being wealthy in fish. Cultivating additionally blasts in the LGA with harvests, for example, plantain and oil palm filled nearby. Other significant monetary endeavors occupied with by individuals of Ukanafun LGA incorporate exchange, wood cutting, and specialties making.

Administrative Areas 
The 4 Clans/Districts in Ukanafun;
 Southern Ukanafun
 Northern Ukanafun 
 Southern Afaha 
 Northern Afaha

Major Towns
 Ikot Akpa Nkuk
 Ikot Ibekwe
 Ikot Arankere
 Ikot Etim
 Ikot Akai
 Ikot Akpan Ntuen.
 Ntak Afaha
 Ikot Okumu
 Ikot Ideh
 Ikot Enang
Afaha Odon

References

Local Government Areas in Akwa Ibom State